Muruqucha (Quechua muru blunt; mutilated; stained; pip, grain; smallpox, qucha lake, also spelled Morococha) is a mountain in the Andes of Peru which reaches a height of approximately .  It is located in the Junín Region, Jauja Province, Apata District.

References 

Mountains of Peru
Mountains of Junín Region